Vyacheslav Vitalyevich Dyomin (born 5 September 1968 in Pskov) is a former Russian football player.

External links
 

1968 births
Sportspeople from Pskov
Living people
Soviet footballers
Russian footballers
FK Jelgava players
Russian expatriate footballers
Expatriate footballers in Latvia
FC Zenit Saint Petersburg players
Russian Premier League players
FC KAMAZ Naberezhnye Chelny players
FC Tekstilshchik Kamyshin players
FC Shinnik Yaroslavl players
FC Saturn Ramenskoye players
Association football midfielders
FC Dynamo Vologda players
FC Spartak Kostroma players